Githu Muigai (born 31 January 1960) is a Kenyan lawyer who was the Attorney General of the Republic of Kenya until February 13, 2018, when he resigned.  He holds a bachelor's degree in law from the University of Nairobi, a master's degree in international law from Columbia University School of Law, and was awarded a doctoral degree in law in November 2002. Prior to becoming Attorney General Githu Muigai served in the defunct Constitution of Kenya Review Commission and at the United Nations as Special Rapporteur on contemporary forms of racism, racial discrimination, xenophobia and related intolerance.

2013 Kenya presidential election petition
When the first round of the presidential election took place on 4 March 2013, Uhuru Kenyatta was declared the president-elect of Kenya by the Independent Electoral and Boundaries Commission. Raila Odinga challenged this in the Supreme Court of Kenya.

He was allowed by the court to be Amicus curiae. In his presentation he told the court that the constitution is not clear on what "fresh elections" would entail. He further stated that that if court declare the voters register as having substantial defects as the petition is asking them to, it may mean that the legality of the elections for senators, governors and other elective posts may be questioned since they were elected using the same registers.
Although he was meant to be a non-partisan friend of the court, some believed his submissions were biased towards the winning party.
The court dismissed Raila Odinga's petition on 30 March 2013.

References 

1960 births
Living people
Columbia Law School alumni
University of Nairobi alumni
20th-century Kenyan lawyers
United Nations Special Rapporteurs on racism
Attorneys General of Kenya
Kenyan officials of the United Nations
21st-century Kenyan lawyers